The Société Chimique de France (SCF) is a learned society and professional association founded in 1857 to represent the interests of French chemists in a variety of ways in local, national and international contexts.  Until 2009 the organization was known as the Société Française de Chimie.

History
The Society traces its origins back to an organization of young Parisian chemists who began meeting in May 1857 under the name Société Chimique, with the goal of self-study and mutual education.  In 1858 the established chemist Adolphe Wurtz joined the society, now named the Société Chimique de Paris, and immediately transformed it into a learned society modeled after the Chemical Society of London, which was the precursor of the Royal Society of Chemistry. Like its British counterpart, the French association sought to foster the communication of new ideas and facts throughout France and across international borders. In 1906, the society changed its name from Société Chimique de Paris to Société Chimique de France; in 1983 it became the Société Française de Chimie; and in 2009 it returned to the name Société Chimique de France.

Activities
Support for the Bulletin de la Société Chimique de Paris began in 1858.

In the 21st century, the society has become a member of European Chemical Society, which is an organization of 16 European chemical societies.  This European consortium was established in the late 1990s as many chemical journals owned by national chemical societies were amalgamated. In 2010 they started ChemistryViews.org, their news and information service for chemists and other scientists worldwide.

Prizes and awards
The society acknowledges individual achievement with prizes and awards, including:
 Louis Ancel Prize
 Raymond Berr Prize
 1978: Jean-Marie Lehn

 Lavoisier Medal of the Société Chimique de France is awarded to a person or institution in order to distinguish the work or actions which have enhanced the perceived value of chemistry in society.
 1904: James Dewar
 1906: William Perkin

 1912: Victor Grignard

 1922: Theodore William Richards

 1935: Cyril Norman Hinshelwood

 1948: Alexander R. Todd, Baron Todd
 1949: Rudolf Signer

 1954: Iraj Lalezari
 1955: Karl Ziegler

 1968: Robert Burns Woodward

 1983: Paul B. Weisz

 1992: M. Julia and R. Wey
 1993: W. Hess, A. Lattes, E. Maréchal, E. Papirer and L.-A. Plaquette
 1994: D.-A. Evans; M.-A. de Paoli; Rudolph Marcus; S. Wolff
 1995: Derek Barton; R. Hoppe

 1997: Jean-Marie Lehn
 1998: Jean-Baptiste Donnet
 1999: Gesellschaft Deutscher Chemiker (GDCh)
 2000: F. Albert Cotton

 2004: Fred McLafferty

 2013: Gérard Férey
 2015: Jacques Livage, Henri B. Kagan
 2018: Christian Amatore

See also

 List of engineering awards
 List of chemistry awards
 List of chemistry societies
 Royal Society of Chemistry, 1841
 Deutsche Chemische Gesellschaft, 1867
 American Chemical Society, 1876
 Chemical Society of Japan, 1878

Notes

External links
 Société Chimique de France website

Scientific organizations established in 1857
Learned societies of France
Scientific organizations based in France
Chemistry societies
Chemistry education
1857 establishments in France